Juan Téllez-Girón, 2nd Duke of Osuna, Grandee of Spain, (in full), (20 Octubre 1559 – 25 November 1600), was a Spanish nobleman.

Juan Téllez-Girón was the son of Pedro Girón, 1st Duke of Osuna and of Leonor Ana de Guzmán y Aragón (c.1540–23 November 1573), daughter of Juan Alfonso Pérez de Guzmán, 3rd Duke of Medina Sidonia. In 1570, he married his cousin Ana María de Velasco, daughter of Íñigo Fernández de Velasco, 4th Duke of Frías, with whom he had 5 children.

Sources

External links
Genealogy of Juan Tellez-Girón, 2nd Duke of Osuna

1559 births
1600 deaths
102
101
106
Juan
Juan
Grandees of Spain